Cyana brunnea is a moth of the family Erebidae. It was described by George Thomas Bethune-Baker in 1904. It is found in Papua New Guinea.

References

Cyana
Moths described in 1904